"N.O.R.E." is a song by American hip hop recording artist Noreaga, released on April 28, 1998, as the lead single from his solo debut studio album N.O.R.E. (1998). The song, which serves as Noreaga's solo commercial debut single, was produced by Poke & Tone of the Trackmasters.

Music video
The music video, directed by Diane Martel, depicts Noreaga trying to escape from imprisonment. Fellow New York-based rappers Busta Rhymes, Spliff Star, Cormega, Fat Joe and Musaliny, all make cameo appearances in the music video.

In other media
In 2005, the song was featured in the soundtrack to the video game Grand Theft Auto: Liberty City Stories.

Charts

References

1998 songs
1998 debut singles
N.O.R.E. songs
Song recordings produced by Trackmasters
Tommy Boy Records singles
Music videos directed by Diane Martel
Songs written by N.O.R.E.
Songs written by Jean-Claude Olivier
Songs written by Samuel Barnes (songwriter)